The Catalan football championship (Campionat de Catalunya) was a football competition in Catalonia and the first football league in Spain before La Liga was established in 1929.

In December 1900, Alfons Macaya, the president of Hispania AC, offered a trophy (the Copa Macaya) to be contested by several football teams from Spain. The league was played between 1901 and 1940 and was cancelled in Francoist Spain after the Spanish Civil War.

History

Early history

In 1901, Hispania AC became the first Catalan champions after winning the inaugural Copa Macaya, the first football championship played on the Iberian Peninsula. The following season, 1901–02, saw FC Barcelona win the title, the club's very first piece of silverware. During the 1902–03 season, two rival competitions were organized with RCD Espanyol winning the Copa Macaya after beating Hispania 3–1 in a title-deciding play-off (as they had finished level on points), while FC Barcelona won the Copa Barcelona. After 1903 the championship was organized by the Football Associació de Catalunya and it became known as the Campionat de Catalunya, and they recognized the Macaya Cup as the first edition of the Campionat de Catalunya. The stand-out players of this Copa Macaya period were Joan Gamper, who was proclaimed the top scorer of the first two tournaments with 31 and 19 goals respectively, and Gustavo Green, who is considered to have been the first great star of Catalan football, winning all the three editions of the Copa Macaya with three different clubs (Hispania, Barça and Español). The winners of the Campionat de Catalunya also began to represent Catalonia in the Copa del Rey. By 1917 the league had turned professional and included a second division.

First dynasty
The first edition of the Campionat de Catalunya in 1903–04 was won by Club Espanyol (now RCD Espanyol), which at the time had Gustavo Green, and also with Ángel Ponz and José Maria Soler. The first dynasty of the Catalan championship came shortly after, when X Sporting Club won it three times in a row between 1906 and 1908. This historic X side had great national figures of that time such as Pedro Gibert, Emilio Sampere, the Massana brothers (Santiago and Alfredo), José Irízar and José Berdié, with the latter four going on to play for Barcelona. On the other hand, FC Internacional achieved three successive runner-up finishes between 1904 and 1906, and interestingly, they lost the title to a different opponent each time: Club Español, FC Barcelona and X Sporting Club respectively. This FCI team had the likes of Paco Bru, Charles Wallace and Enrique Peris, all of which went on to join Barcelona. Naturally, all of these great players joining Barcelona meant a big leap in quality for the club, and as a result, at the turn of the first decade, Barcelona was enjoying its first great team. As well as the aforementioned players, Barça also had the likes of Amechazurra, Romà Forns, Pepe Rodríguez and Carles Comamala, and this team managed to repeat X's feat of winning three championships in a row, doing it so between 1909 and 1911. Their streak came to an end when RCD Espanyol won their second championship in 1911–12, largely thanks to the goalscoring feats of their foreign players such as Frank Allack, captain Victor Gibson and the Wallace brothers, Charles and Percy.

Barcelona dominance
In the 1910s, FC Espanya, propelled by their infamous back line of Hermenegild Casellas and Eduardo Reguera, began to disrupt the monopoly of Barcelona and RCD Espanyol, winning the championship three times in 1912–13, 1913–14 and 1916–17. However, RCD Espanyol managed to form an even better defense whose solo architect was Ricardo Zamora, thus claiming the title in 1914–15 and 1917–18, winning the former after beating Barça 4–0 in the title-deciding play-off, with braces from Juan López and José Maria Tormo. The Catalan Championship then witnessed their third dynasty, which was with no doubt the greatest. At the turn of the second decade, Barça was enjoying its second golden age, which was the legendary team coached by Jack Greenwell, that also included Paulino Alcántara, Sagibarba, Félix Sesúmaga, Ricardo Zamora and Josep Samitier, and this side won 9 out of 10 titles between 1919 and 1928. The only team that managed to break their supremacy was CE Europa in the 1922–23 season, largely thanks to Estebán Pelaó, Manuel Cros and Antonio Alcázar, with the latter netting the only goal of the title-deciding play-off (they had finished tied on points) that gave CE Europa the trophy.

Decline and Collapse
In 1928 three Catalan clubs: FC Barcelona, RCD Espanyol and CE Europa, became founding members of La Liga and the Campionat de Catalunya gradually began to decline in importance during the Spanish Civil War. In the 1930s, the championship was won by either Barcelona or Espanyol, sept in 1933-34 when CE Sabadell FC, surprised everyone by winning it against all odds. The last edition of the competition was held on 1939-40, and the Campionat de Catalunya ended in the same way it began: With an RCD Espanyol triumph.

Historical classification

The historical classification of Catalonia Football Championship is a classification that compiles all the matches, results, points and goals of all the teams that participated in the Championship of Catalonia football since its inception in 1900 until its disappearance in 1940. The classification includes the results of the Copa Macaya, the Barcelona Cup and the championship of the Football Association of Catalonia, also considered official. The 1902–03 and 1912–13 seasons were contested with two clubs claiming championships. This classification has been done with the data collected through the archives of Los Deportes, Mundo Deportivo, La Vanguardia. Classification may contain errors due to the inaccuracy of the data published in those years,

Champions 
Source

Titles by Team

See also
Copa Macaya
Copa Catalunya
Supercopa de Catalunya
Catalonia national football team

References

External links
  List of Champions of Catalonia and Spain at www.rsssf.com
 Catalan football championship Final Tables at www.rsssf.com
  Catalan football championship statistics and squads at www.futcat.org

Catalan football competitions
Defunct football leagues in Spain
Sports leagues established in 1901
1901 establishments in Spain
1940 disestablishments in Spain
History of football in Spain